Emir Tufek (born 04.10.1966) is a Bosnian professional football manager and former player.

Managerial career
Tufek took the reins at Zvijezda Gradačac in January 2014, replacing Denis Taletović. In October 2014, he was named assistant to manager Meho Kodro at FK Sarajevo. He replaced Nedim Jusufbegović as manager of Igman Konjic in May 2019.

Managerial statistics

Honours

Player
Velež Mostar
Yugoslav Cup: 1985–86

Sarajevo
Bosnian Cup: 1997–98
Bosnian Supercup: 1997

References

External links

1965 births
Living people
People from Jablanica, Bosnia and Herzegovina
Association football midfielders
Yugoslav footballers
Bosnia and Herzegovina footballers
FK Velež Mostar players
NK Varaždin players
NK Belišće players
HNK Gorica players
FK Sarajevo players
Yugoslav First League players
Croatian Football League players
Bosnia and Herzegovina expatriate footballers
Expatriate footballers in Croatia
Bosnia and Herzegovina expatriate sportspeople in Croatia
Bosnia and Herzegovina football managers
FK Velež Mostar managers
NK Zvijezda Gradačac managers
FK Igman Konjic managers
Premier League of Bosnia and Herzegovina managers
Bosnia and Herzegovina expatriate football managers